Oshikhandass is a village in Gilgit-Baltistan. It is east of Gilgit city. Oshikhandass is part of the Bagrot Valley and had approximately 7,200 inhabitants in 2011. Approximately60% of the population belongs to the Shia Isna Ashri Muslims sect of Islam, and 40% are Shia Imamia Ismaili Muslims, that follows the 4th (Aga Khan) 
The local economy is primarily agriculture based. There are three government schools, two of which are for girls and one is for boys. In addition there are five private schools. The village altitude is 1,500 metres (4,900 ft).

This village links Bagrot Valley and Jalal Abad to Danyor, a city in Gilgit. The Karakorum Highway runs through the town. Shina and Burushaski are the main languages. Nanga Parbat, which lies to the east of the village, can be seen from Oshikhandass. The village was previously part of India before the India-Pakistan division. After the division, the village was annexed to Pakistan.

History 
The historic name of Oshikhandass was "Punal Dass". The name of this village Oshikhandass evolved from two languages. "Oshi" means wind in Shina language, "Khan" means 'town' in the Burushaski language and "Dass" means 'uncultivated land' in both languages. This land was under custody of the valley. It was cultivated by the people who came from Bagrot Valley and Hunza in July 1937 led by Numbardar Khuda Amman. These people were sent by the Mir of Hunza, as he made a verbal agreement with the people of Bagrot Valley. Those people (who came from Hunza on the 54 of the people of Oshikhandass) constructed the water channel which supplies water to the village even today. The two main people who leaded the project were both named Hubi Ali (often called elder Hubi and young Hubi), both remained in Oshikhandass after completion of the channel along most of the workers who came along them from Hunza. The water channel is linked to the river which comes from Glaciers of Karakoram through Bagrot valley. Most of the water of Oshikhandass comes from the Bagrot Glacier.

Oshikhandass Welfare and Development organization (OWDO) is a registered welfare organization in the village. This organization was founded in 2005 by Manzoor Hussain, a social worker. Many people from Oshikhandass work in Gilgit, as shopkeepers and in other small enterprises.

Places nearby
 Jalalabad
 Danyor

See also
 Gilgit

References

Gilgit District
Populated places in Gilgit District